Mareile is a German forename and may refer to

Mareile Höppner (born 1977), a German television presenter and journalist
Mareile Krumbholz (born 1982), a German organist and music teacher 
 Mareile Flitsch, a German sinologist, professor at the University of Zurich

German feminine given names